Edward Wright (dates of birth and death unknown) was an English cricketer who made seven appearances in first-class cricket.

Wright made his debut in first-class cricket for Manchester Cricket Club in 1844 against a Yorkshire XI at Moss Lane. He played a further six first-class matches until 1849. He scored a total of 88 runs in his seven matches, with a high score of 23.

References

External links

Date of birth unknown
Date of death unknown
English cricketers
Manchester Cricket Club cricketers